"Maidenform" is the sixth episode in the second season of the American television drama series Mad Men.  It was written by Matthew Weiner and directed by Phil Abraham.  The episode originally aired on the AMC channel in the United States on August 31, 2008.

Plot 
Herman "Duck" Phillips informs Don that Sterling Cooper's client, Playtex, wants a new campaign more like the Maidenform "dream" campaign. Peggy, Salvatore, Ken Cosgrove, Paul Kinsey, and Frederick Rumsen discuss the Playtex campaign.  

Don and Betty attend an event at a country club on Memorial Day 1962. The following morning, Betty is shown wearing a bikini purchased from the club fashion show and Don tells her she looks desperate. 

Peggy finds out that the others had had an informal, after-hours discussion about the Playtex campaign. Kinsey reveals his plan to compare women to Jackie Kennedy and Marilyn Monroe for the Playtex campaign, identifying women in the office as "Jackies" or "Marilyns". Peggy disagrees with his theory and is told she is more like Gertrude Stein or Irene Dunne. Peggy asks Joan Holloway why she isn't being included. Joan replies that Peggy needs to "learn to speak the language" and advises her to stop dressing like a little girl. Playtex executives turn down the campaign.

Bobbie reveals that women have been talking about Don's many affairs and ability in the bedroom. When she keeps testing him after being told to "stop talking", Don ties her to the bed and leaves. 

The creative team meet the Playtex executives at a strip club. Peggy surprises the team by showing up in a revealing dress and sits on a Playtex executive's lap in view of a visibly jealous Pete. 

In the last scene of the episode Don is seen shaving, watched by his daughter Sally. Sally remarks that she "won’t talk" as to not disturb Don while shaving so he doesn’t cut himself. Reminded of the conversation he had with Bobbie about his reputation when he told her to "stop talking", Don asks Sally to leave and becomes upset while staring at himself in the mirror.

Reception 
The episode was received positively by critics at the time. Noel Murray, writing for The A.V. Club, graded the episode an A- and commented on the surprising aspects of the episode, stating "I can’t imagine a more surprising start" and "I can’t imagine a more surprising turn". He also discussed the interesting use of mirrors in the episode. However, he criticized the episode saying that Betty fits into this episode "too neatly". Alan Sepinwall liked the episode but wasn't overwhelmed by it stating, ""Maidenform" is a less intense episode than last week's "The New Girl," but it features a number of typically beautiful, haunting "Mad Men" moments."

The episode was nominated for Outstanding Single Camera Picture Editing for a Drama Series at the 61st PrimeTime Emmy Awards.

Production 
The episode was written by Matthew Weiner. It was directed by Phil Abraham. During an AMC interview Matthew Weiner describes the idea between the two sides of a woman, in this case being Jackie and Marilyn, stemming from the sort of groups that men place people and more specifically women into, whether it being the "mom, Madonna, the whore, the slut". Saying "It’s really how we come across to other people". Elisabeth Moss then describes how Peggy is supposed to "resemble the first women who stand up with the men and do their job". She also describes the scene at the club, and how it is the point where Peggy realizes she will never be one of the boys. Weiner then discusses how the episode carries an idea of a blurred line between perception and reality, and how this is seen when Bobbie talks about her kids and when Betty wears a bikini. He also discusses how "Don is the only character to have a reputation" and how this is crushing to him.

Weiner said in 2019 that the episode is

References

External links 

 "Maidenform" at AMC
 

Mad Men (season 2) episodes
2008 American television episodes